Project Harmony may refer to:

 Project Harmony (organization), an international organization which aims to build a strong global community
 Project Harmony (FOSS group), an initiative concerning Open Source software
 Apache Harmony was an Apache Software foundation project to create a FOSS Java implementation